BOSH! is a duo of British vegan chefs from Sheffield consisting of Henry Firth and Ian Theasby. They rose to fame in 2016 with the launch of their YouTube channel, and have gone on to host the ITV1 television programme Living on the Veg and author a number of books. Their eponymous vegan cookbook ranked fifth in the Sunday Times Bestsellers chart in 2018, and is among the top 50 best-selling UK cookbooks of all time.

Early life 
Firth was born in Hackney, a district of East London, in April 1984. Son of a teacher and professor, he worked in the tech industry for 12 years after leaving Sixth Form, for various companies including Blacks, Arcadia Group and Drum&BassArena. Theasby's originates from Sheffield. Born in the Yorkshire city in August 1984, he is the son of a nurse and a teacher. He worked in the fashion industry after leaving school, choosing not to attend university. Firth and Theasby's relationship began at the age of 11 when the pair attended High Storrs School in Sheffield.

The pair became vegan in the mid-2010s: Theasby aimed to give something up each month and after an alcohol-free January, decided on giving up meat for February and additionally giving up dairy in March. The pair watched the documentary Cowspiracy together, after which Firth became vegan. They were concerned over the environmental impact of meat production.

Career 
In 2016, Firth and Theasby launched BOSH.TV, a social media channel publishing videos of vegan cookery. The name BOSH! was chosen because it "sound[ed] fast and fun and the very opposite of fussy", a mantra they took into their video production style. The duo adopted a camera style similar to that of other YouTube food brands like BuzzFeed Tasty, with the hope that the vegan nature of their content would help set them apart. BOSH's initial success came in the form of a 'healthy sushi cake' video, which hit 3.5m views on Facebook, and a viral 'watermelon Jagerbomb' video which racked up 20 million views across all platforms. A profile in The Times dubbed them "the vegan Jamie Olivers".

In 2018, BOSH! released their first vegan cookbook of the same name. It became the UK's best-selling vegan cookbook of all time, and one of the 50 best-selling UK cookbooks. It received a British Book Award and a PETA Vegan Food Award. They subsequently published several further cookbooks and the book How to Live Vegan. Their first book reached 350,000 UK sales in 2018. By 2022, the pair had reached a million sales from books published in 60 countries in eight languages. At this point the revenue from UK print sales (excluding lockdown periods) was £6million, from 600,000 sales.

Alongside their range of cookbooks, Firth and Theasby brought BOSH! to British television screens in 2020 with their ITV1 show Living on the Veg. The 10-part series was ITV's first vegan cooking programme, and featured a series of recipes cooked by Firth and Theasby and a guest who talks about food and their work.

BOSH! have appeared on television programmes such as Good Morning Britain, This Morning, BBC Breakfast, Sunday Brunch, and The Today Show. They were interviewed for BBC Radio 2 by presenters Claudia Winkleman Michael Ball and Jo Whiley.

BOSH! products 
BOSH! launched a range of plant-based products into supermarkets nationwide across the UK. The range of products includes cake mixes, savoury mixes, store cupboard products, sweet treats and ready meals, with the intention of encouraging individuals to adopt the vegan diet.

As well as being stocked in all major UK supermarkets, BOSH! products are all available in Costa Coffee shops UK-wide.

Books
BOSH! (2018)
Bish Bash BOSH! (2019)
How to Live Vegan (2019)
BOSH! Healthy Vegan (2019)
Speedy BOSH! (2020)
BOSH! on a Budget (2021)

Partnerships 

 Brewdog - Released two BOSH! beers and designed plant-based options for pub menus
 Alpro - Ambassadors
 Tesco - Launched Vegmas Christmas campaign
 Kettle Chips - Launched first plant-based cheese and onion crisps
 Vitalite - On-pack promotion for BOSH! METHOD - a plant based cooking course 
 AXA - AXA Start Up Angel Judges

Awards and honours 

 BOSH! - 2018 Best Book - PETA Vegan Food Awards
 BOSH! - Silver Nielssen Award for more than 250,000 UK copies sold
 BOSH! - 2019 Non-fiction: Lifestyle 
  BOSH! - 2019 Marketing Strategy of the Year - British Book Awards (Nibbies)
 SPEEDY BOSH! - 2020 Best Vegan Cookbook - PETA Vegan Food Awards

See also
 List of vegan media

References

External links
Official site

Living people
British cookbook writers
British male bloggers
British veganism activists
Chefs of vegan cuisine
English bloggers
English food writers
English television presenters
English YouTube groups
English YouTubers
Lifestyle YouTubers
People from Sheffield
Vegan cookbook writers
Year of birth missing (living people)